Suzanne Gorman (born June 8, 1962) is an American photographer based in St. Louis. Her client list includes former President Bill Clinton, former First Ladies Barbara Bush and Hillary Clinton, and sports and entertainment personalities such as Nelly, Cory Spinks, Bob Costas, Ozzie Smith, Jackie Joyner, Stephanie Patton, and Kathryn Sansone.  She has also photographed Cirque du Soleil and hip-hop and musical artists such as Destiny's Child and Sting.

Biography 
Gorman was born in St. Louis in 1962.  Her father Charles David Gorman was a professor of mathematics and her mother Gong Shu a psychodrama therapist.

Gorman attended University City High School, graduated at the age of 16, and then enrolled in Fontbonne College, receiving a degree in fine arts in 1983. Her interest in photography did not start until college, when she inherited her father's Leica camera after he died, at which point she took her first ever photography class. In 1981 she worked for St. Louis Mayor Vincent C. Schoemehl, and in 1982 she became an intern for Rick Gould, a local fashion photographer.

She cites Richard Avedon as one of her major influences and respects the work of Annie Leibovitz.

Reception
The St. Louis Post Dispatch in 1995 started its article about Gorman with, "Suzy Gorman looks tough, talks gruff and acts rough. Is it shtick or is it Suzy?" and concludes that "it" is in fact Suzy. She is known for dismissing clients, instructing them to lose weight, and she is equally direct about telling people to change everything from their hair to their teeth.

References 
 St. Louis Business Journal, August 5–11, 2005, "St. Louis Character: Suzy Gorman"
 Alive magazine, September 2005, "Girl talk: Photographer Suzy Gorman Shoots from the Hip."
 KTVI Channel 2 News, February 2005, "Photographer with tales to tell about some of the big stars"
 Seen, May 1992, "That Gorman girl shoots anything that moves (especially her mouth)"
 From the Halls of Fame, 2005, St. Louis Commerce Magazine
 St. Louis Post Dispatch, February 23, 1995, "Suzy Gorman, photographer to the stars"

External links
 Official Suzy Gorman website

American photographers
Fontbonne University alumni
Artists from St. Louis
1962 births
Living people
American women photographers
21st-century American women